The 1980 UMass Minutemen football team represented the University of Massachusetts Amherst in the 1980 NCAA Division I-AA football season as a member of the Yankee Conference. The team was coached by Bob Pickett and played its home games at Alumni Stadium in Hadley, Massachusetts. UMass finished the season with a record of 7–3 overall and 4–1 in conference play.

Schedule

References

UMass
UMass Minutemen football seasons
Umass Minutemen football